Otto, Lord of Arkel ( – 26 March or 1 April 1396) was Lord of Arkel from 6 May 1360 until his death.

Life 
He was a son of John IV and his wife, Irmengard of Cleves.  Otto was born as his parents' second son, after his elder brother John, who died during a tournament in Dordrecht in 1352.  During his reign, he further extended the family possessions: he acquired the Lordship of Haastrecht again, and in 1379, he acquired Liesveld.

Otto became an advisor to Count Albert of Holland.  Albert claimed the County of Cleves, after John, the last count, died.  However, the Emperor gave Cleves to Adolph II of the Marck.  This caused a lasting animosity between the Houses of Arkel and La Marck.

In 1382, Otto granted town privileges to Gorinchem, Hagestein and Leerdam.  In the following years, Otto tried to combine Hagestein Castle and the village of Gasperde and create a new town out of this combination.  This was triggered by the Lords of Vianen, who were expanding their territory to the south-west, by annexing Noordeloos and Meerkerk.  This isolated some manors Arkel owned in this area.  Also, the Lords of Vianen sided with the Hooks.

Marriage and issue 
Otto married in 1360 in Deventer to Elisabeth de Bar (d. 1410), daughter and heiress of Theobald of Bar-Pierrepont. They had one son:
 John V (1362-1428), succeeded Otto as Lord of Arkel.

Otto's illegitimate sons:
 Hendrick of Nyenstein
 John, the bastard of Arkel (d. 1405)
 John of Ravestein

Footnotes 

14th-century births
Year of birth unknown
1396 deaths
Lords of Arkel
People from South Holland
14th-century people of the Holy Roman Empire